Hiram E. Fitzgerald (born November 12, 1940) is an American psychologist and University Distinguished Professor Emeritus in Department of Psychology at Michigan State University.

References

Living people
Michigan State University faculty
Psycholinguists
University of Denver alumni
21st-century American psychologists
1940 births
Linguists from the United States
20th-century American psychologists